Wakita is a town in Grant County, Oklahoma, United States, founded in 1898, approximately  south of the Kansas border. Its population was 344 at the 2010 census, a decrease of 18.1 percent (from 420) at the 2000 census. Wakita is notable as a location in the 1996 feature film Twister.

Geography

History

Before the town's founding in 1898, there was a dispute over the right to name the town. The town's postmaster, and the owner of the first general store, and the town's first postmaster, believed it should be named Whiteville. Local Deputy U.S. Marshall Herbert John Green motioned for the town be named after a Cherokee chief of local significance named Wakita (pronounced Wok-ih-taw).  Green and other local settlers wanted to name the town in the chief's honor because of a protective spell cast by the chief's tribe to protect the area around the town, between Crooked Creek and Pond Creek, from tornadoes for 100 years. The name was also favored because of a battle that had occurred in the area under the leadership of this chief.

Citing historian George Shirk, the Encyclopedia of Oklahoma History and Culture states that Wakita is a Cherokee word for water collected in a small depression, such as a buffalo wallow. The same source states that Charles N. Gould claimed it was probably a Creek word meaning "to cry" or "to lament".

The town was founded when the Cherokee Outlet was opened to non-Native American settlement on September 16, 1893. A post office opened November 14, 1893. The population grew when the Hutchison and Southern Railroad (later the Atchison, Topeka and Santa Fe Railway) built a line through the area in 1897. At statehood in 1907, Wakita had 388 residents; by 1910, it had grown to 405.

Wakita was selected as a filming location for the Hollywood blockbuster Twister (1996). In the film, the town is referred to by name, and the water tower bearing its name is shown.

On May 10, 2010, numerous tornadoes touched down in Grant County, causing significant damage near the Wakita area. However, the town itself was not destroyed.

Demographics
As of the census of 2010, there were 344 people, 165 households, and 102 families residing in the town. There were 205 housing units at an average density of 622.5 per square mile (239.9/km2). The racial makeup of the town was 96.67% White, 0.24% African American, 2.38% Native American, and 0.71% from two or more races. Hispanic or Latino of any race were 0.24% of the population.

There were 165 households, out of which 27.3% had children under the age of 18 living with them, 53.3% were married couples living together, 6.1% had a female householder with no spouse present, and 37.6% were non-families. 32.7% of all households were made up of individuals, and 16.4% had someone living alone who was 65 years of age or older. The average household size was 2.30 and the average family size was 2.94.

In the town, the population was spread out, with 20.0% under the age of 18, 8.1% from 18 to 24, 21.0% from 25 to 44, 21.7% from 45 to 64, and 29.3% who were 65 years of age or older. The median age was 46 years. For every 100 females, there were 85.8 males. For every 100 females age 18 and over, there were 87.7 males.

The median income for a household in the town was $30,096, and the median income for a family was $34,792. Males had a median income of $22,361 versus $21,500 for females. The per capita income for the town was $17,302. About 11.4% of families and 11.9% of the population were below the poverty line, including 12.3% of those under age 18 and 22.2% of those age 65 or over.

Education
Students in Wakita went to school at Wakita Public School K-12 through the 2010–2011 school year, after which the school closed due to low enrollment (30 students) and lack of necessary funding. Wakita High School merged with Medford Public Schools, although many Wakita students also attend Pond Creek-Hunter High School.

Notable people
 Virgil A. Richard, retired brigadier general in the United States Army and gay rights activist
 Cindy Ross, first female president of Cameron University

Popular culture
Wakita was the setting of a 1984 television commercial about DuPont's subsidiary Conoco using seismograph technology to search for oil. It was aired during the 1984 World Series. The voice over starts with, "Nothing much changes in Wakita, Oklahoma."

Wakita was featured in the 1996 blockbuster film Twister starring Helen Hunt and Bill Paxton in which Wakita was destroyed by an F4 tornado that was part of a storm system later spawning an F5 tornado. False fronts were built onto the existing store fronts for some shots and then were removed and replaced with rubble in the streets after the tornadic storm hit and the rest of the building was removed using CGI.  Some original buildings were demolished and never replaced, with some of the bricks from the demolished buildings used to construct Twister Park.  The Twister Museum, dedicated to movie memorabilia from Twister, opened a few months before the movie was released and remains a town attraction.

References

External links
 "Twister (the movie) Museum" in Wakita

Towns in Grant County, Oklahoma
Towns in Oklahoma